Nataliya Alekseyevna Kudreva (born 8 June 1942) is a volleyball player for the Soviet Union. She was part of the Soviet team which won the gold medal in Women's Volleyball at the 1972 Summer Olympics.

References 

1942 births
Living people
Sportspeople from Krasnodar
Soviet women's volleyball players
Olympic volleyball players of the Soviet Union
Volleyball players at the 1972 Summer Olympics
Olympic gold medalists for the Soviet Union
Russian women's volleyball players
Olympic medalists in volleyball
Medalists at the 1972 Summer Olympics
Honoured Masters of Sport of the USSR